Feelin' It is an album by organist Jimmy McGriff recorded in 2000 and released on the Milestone label the following year.

Reception 

Allmusic's Alex Henderson said: "McGriff was 64 when this CD was recorded in 2000 and, at that age, he wasn't trying to reinvent the wheel. But his fans expected him to provide soul-jazz/hard bop that was solid and consistent; Feelin' It definitely fits that description". Douglas Payne noted "McGriff sounds ok here, but he's sounded this way for years. There's absolutely nothing wrong with what happens here. There's absolutely nothing memorable about it either". In JazzTimes, Owen Cordle wrote "I hope there’ll always be a place for this kind of music in the record industry and on the scene. It’s a reservoir of the right stuff".

Track listing
All compositions by Jimmy McGriff except where noted
 "Stan's Shuffle" (Stanley Turrentine) – 9:01
 "Hard Times" (Paul Mitchell) – 7:45
 "Us" (Wayne Boyd) – 4:52	
 "Feelin' It" (Melvin Sparks) – 5:01
 "Sermonizing" – 5:18
 "All Blues" (Miles Davis) – 6:10
 "Just in Time" (Jule Styne, Betty Comden, Adolph Green) – 6:03
 "City Lights" – 7:31

Personnel
Jimmy McGriff – organ
Bill Easley – tenor saxophone, alto saxophone
David "Fathead" Newman – tenor saxophone (tracks 1, 2, 4 & 5)
Ronnie Cuber – baritone saxophone (tracks 1, 2, 4 & 5)
Wayne Boyd (tracks 3 & 6-8), Melvin Sparks (tracks 1, 2, 4 & 5) – guitar
Kenny Washington (tracks 1, 2, 4 & 5), Don Williams (tracks 3 & 6-8) − drums

References

Milestone Records albums
Jimmy McGriff albums
2001 albums
Albums produced by Bob Porter (record producer)
Albums recorded at Van Gelder Studio